The Institute of Chartered Shipbrokers (ICS) is a professional and learned society for all members of the commercial shipping industry worldwide. After being founded in 1911 in London, the ICS was granted a Royal Charter in 1920.

The Institute provides the shipping industry with highly qualified professionals being the only internationally recognised professional body in the commercial maritime sphere. 
It represents shipbrokers, ship managers and ship agents throughout the world with 24 branches in key locations and comprises 4,000 individual Members and Fellows.

See also
 Baltic Exchange
 Worshipful Company of Shipwrights

References

External links
 ICS's Code of Governance and Professional Conduct
 Shipping Network – Magazine of the Institute of Chartered Shipbrokers

1911 establishments in the United Kingdom
Business organisations based in London
International organisations based in London
International professional associations
Learned societies of the United Kingdom
Organisations based in the London Borough of Southwark
Organizations established in 1911
Chartered Shipbrokers